Albert Matthew "Joe" Thorn (born 18 March 1899) was a rugby union player who represented Australia.

Thorn, a flanker, was born in Manly, New South Wales and claimed a total of 6 international rugby caps for Australia.

References

                   

Australian rugby union players
Australia international rugby union players
1899 births
Year of death unknown
Rugby union flankers
Rugby union players from Sydney